WWIII Live 2003 is a live album by industrial rock band KMFDM from their WWIII tour, recorded at the House of Blues, Chicago on October 27, 2003. It was released on July 27, 2004, on Sanctuary Records. It includes many of the songs from the WWIII album, along with some songs from other albums. The DVD release includes live footage from different venues throughout the tour.

Reception

WWIII Live 2003 received mixed reviews.  Ilker Yücel of ReGen Magazine gave a positive review, while Richard T. Williams of PopMatters panned the release, saying, "The sound of today's KMFDM isn't only devoid of the danceability that once defined it, it is helplessly, aimlessly generic."

Track listing

CD release

DVD release 
 "WWIII" 
 "From Here on Out" 
 "Blackball" 
 "Brute" 
 "Stars & Stripes" 
 "Pity for the Pious" 
 "Moron" 
 "Revenge" 
 "Bullets, Bombs & Bigotry" 
 "Light" 
 "Juke Joint Jezebel" 
 "Intro" 
 "A Drug Against War" 
Music videos:
 "Skurk" (from Attak)
 "Ultra" (from Nihil)
 "Stars & Stripes" (from WWIII)
Additional after-show, backstage, interview and studio footage and more

Personnel
Raymond Watts – vocals, guitars
Sascha Konietzko – vocals, percussion, keyboards
Lucia Cifarelli – vocals, keyboards
Steve White - guitars
Jules Hodgson – guitars
Andy Selway – drums

References

KMFDM live albums
2003 video albums
Live video albums
2003 live albums
Music video compilation albums
2003 compilation albums
Albums recorded at the House of Blues
Sanctuary Records video albums
Sanctuary Records live albums